In phonetics and phonology, relative articulation is description of the manner and place of articulation of a speech sound relative to some reference point. Typically, the comparison is made with a default, unmarked articulation of the same phoneme in a neutral sound environment. For example, the English velar consonant  is fronted before the vowel  (as in keep) compared to articulation of  before other vowels (as in cool). This fronting is called palatalization.

The relative position of a sound may be described as advanced (fronted), retracted (backed), raised, lowered, centralized, or mid-centralized. The latter two terms are only used with vowels, and are marked in the International Phonetic Alphabet with diacritics over the vowel letter. The others are used with both consonants and vowels, and are marked with iconic diacritics under the letter. Another dimension of relative articulation that has IPA diacritics is the degree of roundedness, more rounded and less rounded.

Advanced and retracted

An advanced or fronted sound is one that is pronounced farther to the front of the vocal tract than some reference point. The diacritic for this in the IPA is the subscript plus, . Conversely, a retracted or backed sound is one that is pronounced farther to the back of the vocal tract, and its IPA diacritic is the subscript minus .

Both vowels and consonants may be fronted or backed. In verbal description, the prefix pre- may be used to indicate fronting, especially in the terms prepalatal and prevelar. Otherwise phrases like "fronted u" may be used. For retraction, either the prefix post- may be used to indicate retraction, as above, or phrases like "retracted i" may be used.

In English, the back vowel  is farther forward than what is normally indicated by the IPA letter . This fronting may be shown explicitly, especially within a narrow transcription: .

In English, the plosive in the affricate , as in the word church, is farther back than an alveolar  due to assimilation with the postalveolar fricative . In narrow transcription,  may be transcribed .

Languages may have phonemes that are farther back than the nearest IPA symbol. For example, Polish sz is a postalveolar sibilant. A more precise transcription is therefore . Similarly, the velar consonants in Kwakiutl are actually postvelar; that is, pronounced farther back than a prototypical velar, between velar  and uvular , and is thus transcribed .

Officially, the IPA symbol  stands for the open front unrounded vowel. However, in most languages where it is used,  actually stands for the central, rather than the front vowel. If precision is desired, this may also be indicated with the minus sign , although a number of other transcription are also possible.

Raised and lowered

A raised sound is articulated with the tongue or lip raised higher than some reference point. In the IPA this is indicated with the uptack diacritic .

A lowered sound is articulated with the tongue or lip lowered (the mouth more open) than some reference point. In the IPA this is indicated with the downtack diacritic . Both consonants and vowels may be marked as raised or lowered.

Raised and lowered vowels
In the case of a vowel, raising means that the vowel is closer, toward the top of the vowel chart. Lowering, on the other hand, means that the vowel is more open, toward the bottom of the chart.

In other non-IPA transcription systems, raised vowels are indicated with the iconic upward-pointing arrowhead  while lowered vowels have the downward arrowhead . Thus, IPA  is equivalent to [e˰], IPA  is equivalent to [e˯].

Raised and lowered consonants
With consonants, raising and lowering changes the manner of articulation to have more or less stricture. For example, raised approximants and trills are fricatives, whereas lowered fricatives are approximants. The ambiguous symbols for rear approximant/fricatives may be specified as fricatives with the raising diacritic, or as approximants with the lowering diacritic, . In Spanish, the lenited allophones of the voiced stops are generally transcribed as fricatives even though they are approximants, or intermediate between fricative and approximant. This may be partially due to the fact there is only a dedicated IPA symbol for one of them, the velar approximant. Czech, on the other hand, requires the opposite: Its fricated trill, which is a separate phoneme, may be transcribed as a raised trill, . (A dedicated letter for this sound, is provided by the extIPA and may be used in IPA transcription.)

From most open (least stricture) to most close (most stricture), there are several independent relationships among speech sounds. Open vowel → mid vowel → close vowel → approximant → fricative → plosive is one; flap → stop is another; and trill → trilled fricative yet another. The IPA chart has been organized so that the raising diacritic moves the value of a letter through these series toward the top of the chart, and the lowering diacritic toward the bottom of the chart, but this only works for some of the consonants. While it would be convenient if all consonants could be so ordered, consonants are too diverse for a single dimension to capture their relationships. In addition, many of the points along the series may be nasalized or lateralized as well, and these parameters are independent of stricture.

 {| class=wikitable
|+ Examples of stricture series
! !! Oral !! Nasal !! Flap !! Trill !! Lateral
|-
! Stop
|  ||  ||  ||  || 
|-
! Fricative
|  ||  ||  ||  || 
|-
! Approximant / Vibrant
|  ||  ||  ||  || 
|-
! Close vowel
|  || 
| colspan="3" rowspan="7" align="center" style="background:#D0D0D0" valign="center" | (N/A)
|-
! Near-close vowel
|  || 
|-
! Close-mid vowel
|  || 
|-
! Mid vowel
|  || 
|-
! Open-mid vowel
|  || 
|-
! Near-open vowel
|  || 
|-
! Open vowel
|  || 
|}

Centralized

Centralized vowels

A centralized vowel is a vowel that is more central than some point of reference, or that has undergone a shift in this direction. The diacritic for this in the International Phonetic Alphabet is the dieresis, .

For example, to transcribe rounded and unrounded near-close central vowels, the symbols  may be used.

However, since the IPA does not specify the exact amount of centralization that centralized vowels have, the symbols  and  can in modern transcriptions be used at times to transcribe fully central vowels, or vowels that have a variable amount of centralization.

However, this symbol is not commonly used mainly because of the common practice of avoiding using diacritics wherever possible, and because very few languages contrast front and central open unrounded vowels.

When a transcription system uses both the centralized and the advanced/retracted diacritics, generally the former indicates a more central vowel, so that e.g.  indicates an only slightly centralized (retracted) front vowel , whereas  indicates a more centralized (retracted) front vowel, or even a fully central vowel (which, as stated above, has a dedicated IPA symbol ).

Centralized semivowels

Semivowels can be centralized much like vowels; for instance, the semivowels corresponding to the close central vowels  can be written as centralized palatal semivowels , or centralized velar semivowels . The transcription  vs.  may also denote a distinction in the type of rounding, with the former symbol denoting a semivowel with compressed rounding typical of front vowels, and the latter symbol denoting a semivowel with protruded rounding typical of central and back vowels, though an additional verbal clarification is usual in such cases, as the IPA does not provide any official means to distinguish sounds with compressed and protruded rounding.

Mid-centralized vowels

Mid-centralized vowels are closer to the midpoint of the vowel space than their referent vowels. That is, they are closer to the mid-central vowel schwa  not just by means of centralization, but also by raising or lowering. The diacritic used to mark this in the International Phonetic Alphabet is the over-cross, .

In most languages, vowels become mid-centralized when spoken quickly, and in some, such as English and Russian, many vowels are also mid-centralized when unstressed. This is a general characteristic of vowel reduction.

Even when fully articulated, the vowels of a language may be on the schwa side of a cardinal IPA vowel. One example of this is Lisbon Portuguese, where unstressed e is a near-close near-back unrounded vowel. That is, it lies between the close back unrounded vowel  and schwa, where  sits in the vowel chart, but unlike , is not rounded. It may be written , as in pegar  "to hold", though such a fully narrow transcription is rarely used, with symbols  or  being the usual broader transcriptions.

More and less rounded

For example, the English  often has very little rounding, and may be transcribed . In Assamese, on the other hand, the open back rounded vowel is much more rounded than is typical for a low vowel, and may be transcribed .

These diacritics are sometimes also used with consonants to indicate degrees of labialization.

Sound changes
Many sound changes involve changes in place of articulation:
 raising (phonology)
 imāla ( raising in Arabic)
 iotacism (vowel raising and partly fronting in Greek)
 fronting (phonology)

References

Bibliography

 
 

Phonetics